The second season of the Japanese science fiction action anime TV series Log Horizon premiered on NHK Educational TV October 4, 2014, and concluded on March 28, 2015, with a total of 25 episodes.  The series is based on the novels written by Mamare Touno.

After finding themselves mysteriously trapped inside the Elder Tale game world, Shiroe and his fellow Adventurers have struggled for nearly six months to adjust to their new reality. During this time they managed to restore order to their city of Akihabara as well as defend the People of the Land from the goblin invasion at Zantleaf. However as winter approaches, Shiroe and his friends try to figure out their goals for the future and whether or not they should leave the safety of Akihabara in order to further explore the vast world of Elder Tale.

The series was produced by Studio Deen and directed by Shinji Ishihira, along with series composition by Toshizo Nemoto, character designs by Tetsuya Kumagai based on the original designs by Kazuhiro Hara, art direction by Masakazu Miyake, sound direction by Shoji Hata and soundtrack music by Yasuharu Takanashi. The series was picked up by Crunchyroll for online simulcast streaming in North America and other select parts of the world. The Anime Network later obtained the series for streaming. NHK Enterprise has released the series in Japan on eight Blu-ray and DVD volumes beginning on January 28, 2015 and in 2016, the season got an English DVD and Blu-ray release. The anime was licensed for a home video release by Sentai Filmworks in North America.

The opening theme is "database" by Man With A Mission ft. Takuma while the ending theme is "Wonderful Wonder World*" by Yun*chi. Eriko Matsui performs cover versions of Yun*chi's "Your song*" and "Wonderful Wonder World*" for the fifteenth, sixteenth, eighteenth and nineteenth episodes. Matsui also performs an original insert song for the twentieth episode titled, "Birthday Song". The songs were all performed as her character Isuzu.



Episode list

Home media release
NHK Enterprise released the series in Japan on eight Blu-ray and DVD volumes between January 28 and August 26, 2015.

Notes

References

External links
  
 

2014 Japanese television seasons
02